The Taifa of Algeciras was a medieval Muslim taifa kingdom in what is now southern Spain and Gibraltar, that existed from 1035 to 1058.

History
The taifa was created in 1013, in the wake of the disintegration of the caliphate of Córdoba which began after 1009. When Sulayman ibn al-Hakam took control of the caliphate, he gave Algeciras to the Hammudids, a dynasty who had helped him in gaining the power. The first king of Algeciras was al-Qasim al-Ma'mun, who later was also caliph.

His cousin Yahya al-Mu'tali annexed Algeciras to the taifa of Málaga in 1035. In 1039 Muhammad ibn al-Qasim, son of al-Qasim, was proclaimed emir of Algeciras.

In 1055 al-Mu'tamid ibn Abbad, lord of Seville, appeared under Algeciras' walls, forcing Muhammad to leave the taifa, which was annexed to that of Seville.

Following its conquest, the kings of Spain (such as Philip IV) sometimes included the kingdom of Algeciras among their titles.

List of Emirs
Muhammad ibn al-Qasim: 1035–1048
al-Qasim al-Wathiq: 1048–1058

See also
 List of Sunni Muslim dynasties

Algeciras
Algeciras
Hammudid dynasty
History of Andalusia
11th century in Al-Andalus
States and territories established in 1035
1035 establishments in Europe
States and territories disestablished in 1058
1058 disestablishments in Europe